In mathematics, a partition matroid or partitional matroid is a matroid that is a direct sum of uniform matroids. It is defined over a base set in which the elements are partitioned into different categories. For each category, there is a capacity constraint - a maximum number of allowed elements from this category. The independent sets of a partition matroid are exactly the sets in which, for each category, the number of elements from this category is at most the category capacity.

Formal definition
Let  be a collection of disjoint sets ("categories"). Define a subset  to be "independent" when, for every index , . The sets satisfying this condition form the independent sets of a matroid, called a partition matroid. 

The sets  are called the categories or the blocks of the partition matroid. 

A basis of the partition matroid is a set whose intersection with every block  has size exactly . A circuit of the matroid is a subset of a single block  with size exactly .

Every partition matroid is the direct sum of a collection of uniform matroids, one for each of its blocks.

In some publications, the notion of a partition matroid is defined more restrictively, with every . The partitions that obey this more restrictive definition are the transversal matroids of the family of disjoint sets given by their blocks.

Properties
As with the uniform matroids they are formed from, the dual matroid of a partition matroid is also a partition matroid, and every minor of a partition matroid is also a partition matroid. Direct sums of partition matroids are partition matroids as well.

Matching
A maximum matching in a graph is a set of edges that is as large as possible subject to the condition that no two edges share an endpoint. Therefore, the bipartite maximum matching problem can be represented as a matroid intersection of these two matroids.

More generally the matchings of a graph may be represented as an intersection of two matroids if and only if every odd cycle in the graph is a triangle containing two or more degree-two vertices.

Clique complexes
A clique complex forms a matroid if and only if  is a complete multipartite graph, and in this case the resulting matroid is a partition matroid. The clique complexes are exactly the set systems that can be formed as intersections of families of partition matroids for which every

Enumeration
1, 2, 5, 16, 62, 276, 1377, 7596, 45789, 298626, 2090910, ... .

References

Matroid theory
Matching (graph theory)